When Ali Came to Ireland is a 2012 Irish documentary film directed by Ross Whitaker. It tells the story of how Killorglin-born circus strongman and publican, Michael "Butty" Sugrue, put up £300,000 and persuaded the renowned American boxing champion Muhammad Ali to make his first visit to Ireland to fight against Alvin Lewis in Croke Park on 19 July 1972.

Ali went to Ireland with an entourage on 11 July 1972 to spend time training for the fight. While there, he was interviewed for RTÉ Television by Cathal O'Shannon and was taught the rudiments of hurling by Eddie Keher.

Ali won the Lewis fight with a technical knockout in the 11th round, and Sugrue lost a lot of money bankrolling it. The documentary was first broadcast on RTÉ One on 1 January 2013.

Ali returned to Ireland twice in later years. He took part in the opening ceremony of the Special Olympics in Dublin in 2003, and he visited the birthplace of his great grandfather, Abe Grady, in Ennis in 2009, where he was made an Honorary Freeman of the town.

Cast

 Muhammad Ali
 Butty Sugrue
 Alvin Lewis
 Cathal O'Shannon
 Jimmy Magee
 Rock Brynner
 Eddie Keher
 Dave Hannigan
 George Kimball

Awards

When Ali Came to Ireland won the Best Sports Programme award at the 10th Irish Film & Television Awards.

References

External links
 Official website
 
 
 
 Photographs of the Ali–Lewis fight

2012 films
2013 television films
2013 films
Biographical films about sportspeople
Documentary films about boxing
Documentary films about historical events
English-language Irish films
Films set in the 1970s
Films shot in the Republic of Ireland
Irish documentary films
Irish television films
Films about Muhammad Ali
Sports films based on actual events
2012 documentary films
Films set in Dublin (city)
2010s English-language films
2010s American films